The Early Years is an EP by Brazilian psychedelic rock band Violeta de Outono, released on July 21, 1988 by now-defunct independent label Wop-Bop Records. It is Violeta de Outono's third official release.

It contains cover versions of songs by some of the band's major influences: The Beatles, Pink Floyd, Gong and The Rolling Stones. Those recordings trace to as far as Violeta de Outono's inception in 1985, and were remastered for this release.

Track listing

Personnel
Violeta de Outono
 Fabio Golfetti — vocals, guitar
 Cláudio Souza — drums
 Angelo Pastorello — bass

Additional musicians
 R. H. Jackson — programming
 Lívio Tragtenberg — tenor sax (3)
 Anderson Rocha — violin (4)
 Maurício Takeda — violin (4)
 Fábio Tagliaferri — viola (4)

Miscellaneous staff
 Angelo Pastorello — cover art

External links
 The Early Years at Violeta de Outono's official Bandcamp

1988 EPs
Covers albums
Violeta de Outono albums